Briars is a surname. Notable people with the surname include:

Diane Briars (born 1951), American mathematics educator
Gawain Briars (born 1958), British squash player and lawyer